Perfect Circle is a 2004 novel by Sean Stewart. It was nominated for Nebula Award for Best Novel in 2004 and the World Fantasy Award for Best Novel in 2005. It is a contemporary realistic fantasy about an exorcist in Texas.

Plot introduction
Texan William Kennedy can see and talk to ghosts – an ability which complicates his life immensely and threatens his relationships with family and friends. When his cousin calls him in to lay the ghost in the garage, Will finds he has a murderer to deal with.

2004 American novels
American fantasy novels
Novels set in Texas
Small Beer Press books